Cécile Didier (1888–1975) was a French stage and film actress.

Selected filmography
 Sister of Mercy (1929)
 Rasputin (1938)
 The Secret of Madame Clapain (1943)
 Man About Town (1947)
 Return to Life (1949)
 Justice Is Done (1950)
 Casimir (1950)
 The Night Is My Kingdom (1951)
 The Drunkard (1953)
 Their Last Night (1953)
 Rasputin (1954)
 Black Dossier (1955)

References

Bibliography
 Robert Hamilton Ball. Shakespeare on Silent Film: A Strange Eventful History. Routledge, 2013.

External links

1888 births
1975 deaths
French film actresses
French silent film actresses
20th-century French actresses
French stage actresses
People from Sarthe